Juz Ḥajjat al-Wida wa Umrat al-Nabi (ﺟﺰﺀ ﺣﺠﺔ ﺍﻟﻮﺩﺍﻉ ﻭﻋﻤﺮﺍﺕ ﺍﻟﻨﺒﻲ) is a comprehensive Arabic commentary on the detailed accounts of the pilgrimage (hajj) of Muhammad. It includes the details of any juridical discussions on the various aspects of pilgrimage, giving the locations, modern-day names, and other details of the places Muhammad passed by or stayed at.

Hajj
Hajj accounts